The 1998 NAIA World Series was the 42nd annual tournament hosted by the National Association of Intercollegiate Athletics to determine the national champion of baseball among its member colleges and universities in the United States and Canada.

The tournament was played, for the one and only time, at Drillers Stadium in Tulsa, Oklahoma.

Albertson (55–8) defeated Indiana Tech (46–22) in a single-game championship series, 6–3, to win the Coyotes' first NAIA World Series.

Oklahoma City outfielder Chris Bradshaw was named tournament MVP.

Bracket

See also
 1998 NCAA Division I baseball tournament
 1998 NCAA Division II baseball tournament
 1998 NCAA Division III baseball tournament
 1998 NAIA Softball World Series

References

NAIA World Series
NAIA World Series
NAIA World Series
NAIA World Series